The Odisha Men's Rugby Sevens Team represents Odisha in rugby sevens. The Odisha Rugby Football Association (ORFA), in association with India Rugby Football Union is the governing body for Odisha Men's Rugby Union Team.  Odisha is currently one of the best rugby football teams in India.

Stadium

The Odisha Rugby Football Association (ORFA) has various bases across the state of Odisha; two of the main bases are Kalinga Stadium and KIIT Stadium in Bhubaneswar.

Kit
Odisha men's team have worn dark blue, red and black for all of their Rugby Union games. At present, the shirt body is dark blue, the sleeves are red and the socks and shorts are both black.

Squad
Odisha's 12 Member Squad for 2018 Senior National Rugby Sevens Championship

Bikranta Kumar Raut (Captain)
Suguda Majhi
Rajkishore Murmu
Alekha Murmu
Bikash Chandra Murmu
Muna Murmu
Niranjan Biswal
Sasanka Sekhar Tripathy
Budhadeb Pradhan
Lokanath Majhi
Ratnakar Hemram
Bibhuti Bhusan Sethi

Administration
The following is the current organisational structure of Odisha Rugby Football Association (ORFA):

References

External links 
 The Official Website of Rugby India

Rugby union in India
Indian rugby union teams